Udyaanalakshmi is a 1976 Indian Malayalam film, directed by K. S. Gopalakrishnan. The film stars Sudheer, Rani Chandra,  KPAC Lalitha, Hari, Jose Prakash and Manju in the lead roles. The film has musical score by G. Devarajan.

Cast

Sudheer
Rani Chandra 
KPAC Lalitha 
Hari 
Jose Prakash 
Manju 
Mohan Sharma 
Ramachandran
Sankaradi 
Shubha 
Vijayan 
Anandavally 
Bhargavi
G. K. Pillai 
K. G. P. Menon
Khadeeja 
Kuthiravattam Pappu 
Prabhavathi 
Sathyan 
Shekhar 
Soman Nair 
Vanchiyoor Madhavan Nair

Soundtrack
The music was composed by G. Devarajan and the lyrics were written by Sreekumaran Thampi.

References

External links
 

1976 films
1970s Malayalam-language films